Yu Yee Oil is a medicated ointment. The name is based on the term ruyi, which literally means "as one wishes". It is available mainly in traditional Chinese medical halls and provision shops, and can also be ordered online.

Health claims
Yu Yee Oil is a herbal medicated ointment for topical (skin) application. It is use traditionally to colic and bloating problems in babies. It is also used to treat mild muscle and joint aches. There is some scientific literature on peppermint oil, the main putative active ingredient in Yu Yee Oil, but the only mention for a topical application is for tension headaches.

Composition
Peppermint Oil (36.0% w/v)
Clove Oil (2.6% w/v)
Nutmeg Oil (0.6% w/v)
Menthol (1.6% w/v)
Borneol Cortex Cinnamoni (1.0% w/v)
Resina Calamus Draco (1.0% w/v)
Light Liquid Paraffin (1.0%% w/v)

References

Ointments
Traditional Chinese medicine